Profane may refer to:

 Profanum, a thing which is not sacred
 Profanity, foul language
 Profane (film), a 2011 film